Life And Death is the third full-length studio album by Australian metalcore band Confession, released on 13 June 2014, through Lifeforce Records. This is the first album to feature the lineup of guitarists Russell Holland and Lyndsay Antica, bassist Steven French, and drummer Jake Dargaville, following the departure of guitarists Dan Brown and Adam Harris, bassist Tim Anderson and drummer Shane O'Brien, leaving Michael Crafter as the only original member.

The album was recorded with Dan Castleman at Lambesis Studios in San Diego, California, in February 2014.

Track listing

Personnel
 Michael Crafter - lead vocals
 Russell Holland - guitar
 Lyndsay Antica - guitar
 Steven French - bass
 Jake Dargaville - drums, percussion
 Daniel Castleman - production, engineering, mixing
 Randy Slaugh - string arrangements, gang vocals, engineering

Charts

References

Confession (band) albums
2014 albums
Lifeforce Records albums